Our Lady of the Rosary Academy is a private, Roman Catholic high school in Mountain View, Colorado.  It is operated independent of the Roman Catholic Archdiocese of Denver.

Background
Our Lady of the Rosary was established in 1978.

External links
 School Website

Notes and references

Catholic secondary schools in Colorado
Schools in Jefferson County, Colorado
Educational institutions established in 1978
1978 establishments in Colorado
Roman Catholic Archdiocese of Denver